The Icelandic Low is a semi-permanent centre of low atmospheric pressure found between Iceland and southern Greenland and extending in the Northern Hemisphere winter into the Barents Sea. In the summer, it weakens and splits into two centres, one near Davis Strait, Labrador, and the other west of Iceland. It is a principal centre of action in the atmosphere circulation of the Northern Hemisphere, associated with frequent cyclone activity. It forms one pole of the North Atlantic oscillation, the other being the Azores High.

See also
Kona low
Aleutian low

References
National Snow and Ice Data Center, retrieved 19 May 2005.

Regional climate effects
Atlantic Ocean
Barents Sea
Geography of Greenland
Climate of Iceland
Climate of Canada
Types of cyclone